Hard Boiled Mahoney is a 1947 film starring the comedy team of The Bowery Boys.  It is the sixth film in the series.

Plot
Sach just lost his job as an assistant to a private detective, but he wasn't paid.  Slip goes with him down to the detective's office to demand payment, but finds the office empty.  A woman enters the office and mistakes Slip for the detective and convinces him to take on a case to find her sister after offering a $50 retainer.

The only clue they have is the spiritualist Dr. Carter.  They track him down, only to see him being murdered.  Slip is knocked unconscious and when he wakes a woman is there calling the police.  Slip identifies her as the other woman's sister, but she denies it.  After asking questions, Slip believes the woman is not the other one's sister and they assist each other in escaping the police and make plans to meet up later.

Slip and Sach then go to see the fortune teller Armand and find out that the two women aren't related, they both just want to get back incriminating letters that Armand has that he uses to blackmail them.  Eventually the good and bad guys meet up at Louie's Sweet Shop and a fight takes place.  As soon as it ends, Louie's waitress, Alice, arrives with the police and takes away Armand and his gang.  The boys then all take turns hitting Slip on the head with their hats after they discover that he used the entire $50 trying to get the information to solve the mystery.

Cast

The Bowery Boys
 Leo Gorcey as Terrance 'Slip' Mahoney
 Huntz Hall as Sach
 Bobby Jordan as Bobby
 William Benedict as Whitey
 David Gorcey as Chuck
 Gabriel Dell as Gabe

Remaining cast
 Bernard Gorcey as Louie Dumbrowski
 Teala Loring as Eleanor
 Dan Seymour as Dr. Armand
 Patti Brill as Alice
 Betty Compson as Salina Webster

Production
This is the only Bowery Boys film in which Gabe (Gabriel Dell) is part of the team, in every other film he is a protagonist or former team member. In this film, he reprises his character of "Talman" (a.k.a. "Pete") that he portrayed in the East Side Kids final film, Come Out Fighting.

Home media
Released on VHS by Warner Brothers on September 1, 1998.

Warner Archives released the film on made-to-order DVD in the United States as part of "The Bowery Boys, Volume Two" on April 9, 2013.

References

External links
 
 
 
 

1947 films
Bowery Boys films
1940s English-language films
American crime comedy films
Monogram Pictures films
Films directed by William Beaudine
American black-and-white films
1940s crime comedy films
1940s American films